The Australian Beverages Council, previously known as the Australian Soft Drinks Association (ASDA) is an industry group that represents the interests of Australian manufacturers, importers and distributors of non-alcoholic beverages.  Their headquarters is in Waterloo, New South Wales, Australia.

References

External links
The Australian Beverages Council Official Website

Business organisations based in Australia
Food and drink in Australia